Thorvald Steen (born 9 January 1954) is a Norwegian writer and government scholar.

He made his literary debut in 1983, and has subsequently published a wide range of novels, plays, collections of poems, books of short stories, children's books and essays. He has distinguished himself as one of Norway's leading internationally oriented writers. His Norwegian breakthrough came in 1992 with a cycle of poems, Ilden (The Fire) and shortly afterward he achieved international recognition with his creative historical novels Don Carlos (1993), Giovanni (1995), Constantinople (1999), The Little Horse (2002), Camel Clouds (2004) and Lionheart (2010). In 2006 Steen wrote the coming-of-age novel The Weight of Snow Crystals, which was followed in 2008 with the freestanding sequel The Longest Leap.

Steen's work is translated into 26 languages and published in 46 countries. He has received several literary prizes, both at home and abroad. In 1993 he received Gyldendals legat (Gyldendal's Endowment). The Belgian newspaper Le Soir declared Don Carlos one of the five best novels translated into French in 1996. The newspaper Clarin in Argentina chose Steen as “Best new writer” for Don Carlos the same year. In 2001 he received the Norwegian Dobloug Prize for his entire work. The novel Camel Clouds was elected novel of the year by the Turkish newspaper Bir Gun in 2006 and won the Slovak Jan Holly Award in 2007. In 2006 Steen received the Comenius Medal from the University of Bratislava for his historical novels, and in 2010 he received the Thomsen Prize.

Steen was the chairman of The Norwegian Authors' Union (1991–97) and he has been an honorary member of the union since 1997. He has also been chairman of the board in Norla (Norwegian Literature Abroad) since 1997 and a member of the board of PEN since 2003. In 2004 he received a Governmental Stipend from the Norwegian Minister of Culture.

Background and authorship

Bibliography

Novels/Short Stories 
 The Invisible Library, 2014
 Balance, 2012
 Lionheart (Løvehjerte) (novel) 2010
 The Longest Leap, 2008
 The Weight of Snow Crystals, 2006
 Bare en siste gang (Just one Last Time), 2005 and 2009
 Camel Clouds, 2004
 The Little Horse, 2002
 Constantinople, 1999
 Kongen av Sahara (King of Sahara), 1997
 Giovanni, 1995
 Don Carlos, 1993
 Tungen (The Tongue), 1991

Poems 
 Under sol og måne (Under Sun and Moon. Photographies by Victor Dimola), 2001
 Alexandrias aske (The Ashes of Alexandria. Poems by Lars Saabye Christensen, Gro Dahle, Paal-Helge Haugen and Thorvald Steen) 1993
 The Fire, 1992
 Månekisten (The Moon Casket), 1987
 Neonulvene (Neonwolfs), 1987
 Vindkommoden (The Wind Chest. Photographies by Per Maning), 1985
 Gjerrige fallskjermer (Stingy Parachutes), 1985
 Hemmeligstemplede roser (Classified Roses), 1983

Essays 
 Den besværlige historien (The Cumbersome History), 2014
 Stories of Istanbul, 2008
 Fra Reykholt til Bosporus (From Reykholt to Bosporus) 2003
 Luftskipet (Airship) 2000
 Jungel. Essays om litteratur og politikk (Jungle. Essays about Literature and Politics), 1996
 En fallskjerm til folket (Parachutes to The People), 1995

Children's books 
 Sometimes You're Absolutely Right(illustrated book), 2015, with Hilde Kramer
 Da pinnsvinet gjorde reven en tjeneste (illustrated book), 2002
 Frosken og sjiraffen og stillheten (illustrated book), 1995
 Da frosken og sjiraffen skulle stupe kråke (illustrated book), 1993
 Frosken og sjiraffen (The Frog and The Giraffe), 1993, illustrated by Marek Woloszyn
 Milli Meter og regnbuen (Milli Meter and The Rainbow) 1992, illustrated by Malgorzata Piotrowska
 Jeg er kanskje en fugl, sa Milli Meter (I Might Be a Bird, said Milli Meter) 1991, illustrated by Malgorzata Piotrowska
 Milli Meter og delfinene (Milli Meter and the Dolphines) 1990, illustrated by Malgorzata Piotrowska

Plays 
 Nidaros, 2013, (music by Timbuktu (Jason Dikaité)
 Desert Storms,  2010, with Tariq Ali
 De tålmodige, 1997

Other 
 Asylet. Gaustad sykehus 150 år (anniversary book) 2005 (ed.)

External links 
Thorvald Steen's biography and bibliography at Aschehoug Agency
Thorvald Steen's biography and complete bibliography (in Norwegian)

1954 births
Living people
Dobloug Prize winners
20th-century Norwegian poets
Norwegian male poets
20th-century Norwegian novelists
21st-century Norwegian novelists
Norwegian male novelists
21st-century Norwegian poets
20th-century Norwegian male writers
21st-century Norwegian male writers